The Museum of the Holocaust - Museo del Holocausto in Guatemala city will be the first museum of the Holocaust in Central America.

The museum opened in 2016. It currently has a temporary exhibition about the Holocaust by bullets perpetrated by the Einsatzgruppen. The exhibition is presented by the organization Yahad -In Unum.

Mission
The museum is aiming to educate new generations about the genocide perpetrated against the Jews, the mass executions and persecutions against the Roma as well as other victims of the Second World War.

See also
List of Holocaust memorials and museums

References

Buildings and structures in Guatemala City
Museums in Guatemala
Museums
Holocaust memorials
Museums established in 2016
Museum education
Jewish museums